Is And Always Was is the seventeenth album by Daniel Johnston released in 2009. The album is noted for its upbeat sound in comparison to previous albums.

Track listing

References 

2009 albums
Daniel Johnston albums